Archive Team is a group dedicated to digital preservation and web archiving that was co-founded by Jason Scott in 2009.

Its primary focus is the copying and preservation of content housed by at-risk online services. Some of its projects include the partial preservation of GeoCities, Yahoo! Video, Google Video, Splinder, Friendster, FortuneCity, TwitPic, SoundCloud, and the "Aaron Swartz Memorial JSTOR Liberator". Archive Team also archives URL shortener services and wikis on a regular basis.

According to Jason Scott, "Archive Team was started out of anger and a feeling of powerlessness, this feeling that we were letting companies decide for us what was going to survive and what was going to die." Scott continues, "it's not our job to figure out what's valuable, to figure out what's meaningful. We work by three virtues: rage, paranoia and kleptomania."

Warrior/Tracker system 
Archive Team is composed of a loose community of independent contributors/users. Their archival process makes use of a "Warrior", a virtual machine environment. Individuals use the Warrior in their desktop environments use to download content without requiring technical expertise. Tasks are allocated by a centrally-managed Tracker that networks with and allocates items to Warriors. The tracker also monitors user upload activity and displays a leader board.

Projects 
Archiving Google+ has been the biggest project of ArchiveTeam as of May 2019 with over 1.56 Petabytes saved.

See also 

 Anna's Archive
 BlueMaxima's Flashpoint
 Digital Dark Age
 Digital hoarding
 Internet Archive
 List of digital preservation initiatives
 Wayback Machine
 Web archiving

References

External links 
 
 Archive Team collection at Internet Archive
 
 
 ArchiveTeam subreddit

Conservation and restoration of cultural heritage
Jason Scott
Organizations established in 2009
2009 in Internet culture
Web archiving
Web archiving initiatives